Fleur Adcock  (born 10 February 1934) is a New Zealand poet and editor, of English and Northern Irish ancestry, who has lived much of her life in England. She is well-represented in New Zealand poetry anthologies, was awarded an honorary doctorate of literature from Victoria University of Wellington, and was awarded an OBE in 1996 for her contribution to New Zealand literature. In 2008 she was made a Companion of the New Zealand Order of Merit, for services to literature.

Early life
Adcock, the older of two sisters, was born in Papakura to Cyril John Adcock and Irene Robinson Adcock. Her birth name was Kareen Fleur Adcock, but she was known as Fleur and legally changed her name to Fleur Adcock in 1982. She spent eight years of her childhood (1939–1947) in England.

Adcock studied Classics at Victoria University of Wellington, graduating with a Bachelor of Arts in 1954 and a Masters of Arts in 1956.

Career 
Adcock worked as an assistant lecturer in classics and librarian at the University of Otago in Dunedin between 1958 and 1962, and as a librarian at the Alexander Turnbull Library in Wellington between 1962 and 1963. 

In 1963, she returned to England and took up a post as a librarian at the Foreign and Commonwealth Office in London. She had already had poems published in a few literary journals in New Zealand at this time. Her first collection of poetry, The Eye of the Hurricane, was published in New Zealand in 1964, and in 1967 Tigers was her first collection published in Britain. 

In 1975, Adcock returned briefly to New Zealand for the first time since she had left for London, and on returning to London in 1976, she became a full time writer. She was the Arts Council Creative Writing Fellow at the Charlotte Mason College of Education in Windermere from 1977–1978, followed by the Northern Arts Literary Fellowship at the universities of Newcastle and Durham from 1979–1981.

Since 1980, Adcock has worked as a freelance writer, living in East Finchley, north London, a translator and poetry commentator for the BBC.

Adcock's poetry is typically concerned with themes of place, human relationships and everyday activities, but frequently with a dark twist given to the mundane events she writes about. Formerly, her early work was influenced by her training as a classicist but her more recent work is looser in structure and more concerned with the world of the unconscious mind. The Oxford Companion to New Zealand Literature (2006) notes that her poems are often written from the perspective of an outsider or express a divided sense of identity inherited from her own emigrant experience and separation from New Zealand family.

In 2006, Adcock won one of Britain's top poetry awards, the Queen's Gold Medal for Poetry, for her collected works, Poems 1960–2000. She was only the seventh female poet to receive the award in its 73 years.

Personal life 
Adcock was married to two notable New Zealand literary personalities. In August 1952, she married Alistair Te Ariki Campbell (divorced 1958), and in February 1962 she married Barry Crump, divorcing in 1963. She has two sons, Gregory and Andrew, both with her first husband. 

Adcock's mother Irene Adcock is also a writer, and her sister Marilyn Duckworth is a novelist.

Poetry collections
 1964: The Eye of the Hurricane, Wellington: Reed
 1967: Tigers, London: Oxford University Press
 1971: High Tide in the Garden, London: Oxford University Press
 1974: The Scenic Route, London and New York: Oxford University Press
 1979: The Inner Harbour, Oxford and New York: Oxford University Press
 1979: Below Loughrigg, Newcastle upon Tyne: Bloodaxe Books
 1983: Selected Poems, Oxford and New York: Oxford University Press
 1986: Hotspur: a ballad, Newcastle upon Tyne: Bloodaxe Books 
 1986: The Incident Book, Oxford ; New York: Oxford University Press
 1988: Meeting the Comet, Newcastle upon Tyne: Bloodaxe Books
 1991: Time-zones, Oxford and New York: Oxford University Press
 1997: Looking Back, Oxford and Auckland: Oxford University Press
 2000: Poems 1960–2000, Newcastle upon Tyne: Bloodaxe Books 
 2010: Dragon Talk, Tarset: Bloodaxe Books  
 2013: Glass Wings, Tarset: Bloodaxe Books and Wellington, NZ: Victoria University Press.
 2014: The Land Ballot, Wellington, NZ: Victoria University Press, Tarset: Bloodaxe Books.
 2017: Hoard, Wellington, NZ: Victoria University Press, Hexham: Bloodaxe Books.
 2019: Collected Poems, Wellington, NZ: Victoria University Press, Hexham: Bloodaxe Books.

Edited or translated
 1982: Editor, Oxford Book of Contemporary New Zealand Poetry, Auckland: Oxford University Press
 1983: Translator, The Virgin and the Nightingale: Medieval Latin poems, Newcastle upon Tyne: Bloodaxe Books, 
 1987: Editor, Faber Book of 20th Century Women's Poetry, London and Boston: Faber and Faber
 1989: Translator, Orient Express: Poems. Grete Tartler, Oxford and New York: Oxford University Press
 1992: Translator, Letters from Darkness: Poems, Daniela Crasnaru, Oxford: Oxford University Press
 1994: Translator and editor, Hugh Primas and the Archpoet, Cambridge, England, and New York: Cambridge University Press
 1995: Editor (with Jacqueline Simms), The Oxford Book of Creatures, verse and prose anthology, Oxford: Oxford University Press

Awards and honours
 1961: Festival of Wellington Poetry Award
 1964: New Zealand State Literary Fund Award
 1968: Buckland Award (New Zealand)
 1968: Jessie Mackay Prize (New Zealand)
 1972: Jessie Mackay Prize (New Zealand)
 1976: Cholmondeley Award (United Kingdom)
 1979: Buckland Award (New Zealand)
 1984: New Zealand National Book Award for Selected Poems (1983)
 1984: Elected Fellow of the Royal Society of Literature
 1988: Arts Council Writers' Award (United Kingdom)
 1996: Officer of the Order of the British Empire, for services to literature, in the 1996 New Year Honours
 2006: Queen's Gold Medal for Poetry (United Kingdom) for Poems 1960–2000
 2007: Honorary Doctor of Literature from Victoria University of Wellington
 2008: Companion of the New Zealand Order of Merit, for services to literature, in the 2008 Queen's Birthday Honours
 2010: Honorary Doctor of Literature from Goldsmiths, University of London

References

External links
Profile and analysis, Emory University
"Sonnets – Fleur Adcock". BBC Radio 4 archive. (Audio 5 mins) Friday 30 May 2003	
Adcock discussing her Selected Poems with Andrew Motion. British Library recording. 14 July 1983 (1 hr, audio)
Poetry Archive profile with poems written and audio
Portrait at the National Portrait Gallery
Review by Herbert Lomas of Poems 1960–2000 by Adcock in Ambit No 161 – 2000
 Interview with Adcock "Final touch" The Guardian  29 July 2000
Guardian book review of Dragon Talk 15 May 2010
 Archival material at 
 Honorary graduates list on Victoria University of Wellington website
Fleur Adcock on her life in poetry. RNZ  interview 16 February 2019

1934 births
Companions of the New Zealand Order of Merit
Fellows of the Royal Society of Literature
Living people
20th-century New Zealand poets
New Zealand women poets
People from East Finchley
People educated at Wellington Girls' College
Victoria University of Wellington alumni
New Zealand Officers of the Order of the British Empire
20th-century New Zealand women writers
21st-century New Zealand poets